"Only Hope" is a song by American band Switchfoot. It was written by Jon Foreman for their 1999 album New Way to Be Human. The Christian-themed song is featured prominently in one of the scenes of the 2002 film A Walk to Remember.

Cover versions

Mandy Moore version

"Only Hope" was recorded by Mandy Moore for the film A Walk to Remember (arranged and produced by the film's composer Mervyn Warren) and is included on her first greatest hits album The Best of Mandy Moore.

Other versions
In 2020, Mat and Savanna Shaw released a cover version of "Only Hope" on their debut album Picture This.

References

1999 songs
2002 singles
Switchfoot songs
Mandy Moore songs
Pop ballads
Songs written by Jon Foreman